Halobellus (common abbreviation: Hbs.) is a genus of halophilic archaea.

References

Euryarchaeota
Taxa described in 2011